Caniapiscau is a regional county municipality in the Côte-Nord region of Quebec, Canada. The seat is Fermont.

The census groups Caniapiscau RCM with neighbouring Sept-Rivières into the single census division of Sept-Rivières—Caniapiscau.  In the Canada 2011 Census, the combined population was 39,500.  The population of Caniapiscau RCM itself was 4260, about two-thirds of whom live in its largest city of Fermont.

Subdivisions
There are 6 subdivisions and 3 native reserves within the RCM:

Cities & Towns (2)
 Fermont
 Schefferville

Unorganized territories (4)
Caniapiscau
Lac-Juillet
Lac-Vacher
Rivière-Mouchalagane

Native Reserves (2)
 Lac-John
 Matimekosh

Naskapi Reserve (1)
 Kawawachikamach

Demographics
 Land area: 70,389.37 km²
 Population: 4,260

Transportation

Access routes
Highways and numbered routes that run through the municipality, including external routes that start or finish at the county border:

 Autoroutes
 None

 Principal Highways
 None

 Secondary Highways
 

 External Routes

See also
 List of regional county municipalities and equivalent territories in Quebec

References

External links
 Official site

Regional county municipalities in Côte-Nord